No. 262 Squadron RAF was an anti-submarine patrol squadron of the Royal Air Force between 1942 and 1945.

History
The squadron was officially formed on 29 September 1942 at RAF Hednesford, although this was a paper exercise as the squadron personnel and equipment were at that moment in transit to Congella in South Africa. It did not start to operate as a squadron until arriving in Durban on 5 November 1942, arriving at Congella a week later, but still had to wait until February 1943 before their first Consolidated Catalina aircraft arrived. It began to operate long anti-submarine patrols over the Indian Ocean. From November 1943 it started to training crews from the South African Air Force with a detachment at Langebaanweg in the Cape Province, it still carried out anti-submarine patrols but began to restrict those patrols to within the South Africa Defence Area. On 15 February 1945 the squadron was disbanded when it was renumbered as 35 Squadron South African Air Force.

Aircraft operated

See also
 List of Royal Air Force aircraft squadrons

References

Notes

Bibliography

 Halley, James J. The Squadrons of the Royal Air Force & Commonwealth 1918–1988. Tonbridge, Kent, UK: Air Britain (Historians) Ltd., 1988. .
 Jefford, C.G. RAF Squadrons, a Comprehensive record of the Movement and Equipment of all RAF Squadrons and their Antecedents since 1912. Shrewsbury, Shropshire, UK: Airlife Publishing, 1988 (second edition 2001). .
 Rawlings, John D.R. Coastal, Support and Special Squadrons of the RAF and their Aircraft. London: Jane's Publishing Company Ltd., 1982. .
 Spring, Ivan. Flying Boat: The History of 262 Squadron RAF and the origins of 35 Squadron SAAF. Johannesburg, South Africa: Spring Air, 1995. .
 The Illustrated Encyclopedia of Aircraft (Part Work 1982–1985), Orbis Publishing, UK.

No. 262
Maritime patrol aircraft units and formations
Military units and formations established in 1942
Military units and formations disestablished in 1945